Cycas lane-poolei is a species of cycad. It was first recognised in 1923 by Charles A. Gardner, the Western Australian government botanist, after a 1921 expedition to the Kimberley region. It is named after Charles Lane Poole.

References

lane-poolei
Endemic flora of Western Australia
Plants described in 1923